Aurora Correa (February 10, 1930 – November 20, 2008) was a Spanish-born teacher and writer, a naturalized Mexican who was part of the group of exiles known as the , which arrived in Mexico during the Spanish Civil War. In her 2008 book Cerezas, she narrates her experiences through the journey and exile.

Biography
Aurora Correa was born on February 10, 1930, in Barcelona. As many of these children never returned to their homeland, they remained in the country and became naturalized Mexicans in 1967.

Correa's professional work was always related to education, literature, and the dissemination of culture. She taught Spanish in high school, worked as a screenwriter, was a copywriter and editor of various publishing houses, and also a radio actress. She wrote for print media such as El Día, Excélsior, Novedades, and Siempre! One such story, published in Novedades, narrates her experiences in the boarding school where she lived in childhood.

She published six books, including La muerte de James Dean (1991) and Ha (1992), which were finalists in the Planeta and Diana novel competitions respectively. Cerezas (2008), her last book, tells of her experiences as one of the Children of Morelia. Only one of her books, Odas (1976), is dedicated to poetry, and her work in this genre is little-known.

Aurora Correa died on November 20, 2008, in the city of León, Guanajuato.

Books
 Agustina Ramírez: heroina del pueblo (1964)
 Odas (1976)
 La muerte de James Dean (1991), 
 Ha (1992), 
 Te beso buenas noches (1997), 
 Cerezas (2008),

Notes

References

1930 births
2008 deaths
20th-century Mexican women writers
20th-century Mexican writers
Exiles of the Spanish Civil War in Mexico
Mexican women novelists
Writers from Barcelona